Gottlob Harrer (8 May 1703 – 9 July 1755) was a German composer and choir leader.

Life 
Harrer was born in Görlitz, and studied music in Leipzig and Italy. From 1731 he worked in the chapel-choir of Reichsgraf Heinrich von Brühl. Following the death of Johann Sebastian Bach in 1750, Harrer became his successor as Thomaskantor in Leipzig, remaining in his post until his own death in 1755. He composed much instrumental music, including 27 symphonies, 24 orchestral suites, 51 flute duets and a number of harpsichord sonatas. He also wrote two masses for choir and orchestra, one mass for unaccompanied voices, 47 cantatas and a number of oratorios, passions, psalms, and motets.

Bibliography
 A. Schering: Der Thomaskantor Johann Gottlob Harrer. In: Bach-Jahrbuch. Band XXVII. 1931
 ADB entry
 Ulrike Kollmar: Gottlob Harrer (1703–1755), Kapellmeister des Grafen Heinrich von Brühl am sächsisch-polnischen Hof und Thomaskantor in Leipzig (= Schriften zur mitteldeutschen Musikgeschichte. Band 12). Ortus-Musikverlag, Beeskow 2006, .

External links

 
http://www.bach-cantatas.com/Lib/Harrer-Johann-Gottlob.htm

1703 births
1755 deaths
Thomaskantors
German classical composers
German male classical composers
German Baroque composers
18th-century classical composers
18th-century conductors (music)
People from Görlitz
18th-century German composers
18th-century German male musicians